Mifflin Township, Ohio may refer to several places:

 Mifflin Township, Ashland County, Ohio
 Mifflin Township, Franklin County, Ohio
 Mifflin Township, Pike County, Ohio
 Mifflin Township, Richland County, Ohio
 Mifflin Township, Wyandot County, Ohio

Ohio township disambiguation pages